Mitchell Johnson was a key member of the Australia cricket team in its 5–0 whitewash of England in the 2013–14 Ashes series. He played in all five Test matches of the series, taking a total of 37 wickets at an average of 13.97 and winning the player of the series award. He was noted for his bowling skills and aggression during the series, which inspired Australia to regain the Ashes for the first time since 2006–07.

Background
The 2013–14 Ashes was the comeback series for Johnson who had been dropped from the Australia's squad for the 2013 Ashes series in England, the first of the two back-to-back Ashes series that year. Australia had lost that series 3–0, their third consecutive Ashes series defeat.

According to Australian captain Michael Clarke and coach Darren Lehmann, Johnson was recalled to the 12-member squad "partly on the faith that he can demonstrate greater control across the series." Clarke backed Johnson's inclusion in the squad on 12 November 2013 and remarked, "I said a couple of days ago if Mitch was selected in this squad, it wouldn't surprise me if in a couple of months' time you see Mitch being Man of the Series."

The Ashes

First Test
In the first Test at Brisbane, Australia won the toss and elected to bat. Coming in to bat at eight, with the score reading 6/132, Johnson made 64 including six fours and two sixes. He was bowled by Stuart Broad, ending a 114-run seventh-wicket partnership with Brad Haddin. Australia were eventually dismissed for 295 on the morning of the second day.

In England's first innings, Johnson shared the new ball with Ryan Harris, but went wicketless in his first spell. He was introduced into the attack after the dismissal of Alastair Cook when Jonathan Trott arrived at the crease. Johnson's first delivery to Trott was a short ball that struck Trott on the gloves. In the first ball of his next over, the last over before lunch, Johnson dismissed Trott off another short ball as Trott edged the ball to the wicket-keeper. In the second session, Johnson continued bowling short and had Michael Carberry caught in the slips for 40, bowling around the wicket. He struck in his next over as Joe Root edged a full delivery to third slip. Johnson took another wicket in his following over, as Graeme Swann inside-edged a length ball to short leg, and England had collapsed from 2/82 to 8/91. England were bowled out for 136 with Johnson finishing with the best figures among Australian bowlers (4 for 61).

Joe Root later reflected on his first innings facing Johnson in Brisbane,
In their second innings, Australia batted positively and declared on 7/401, setting England a target of 561. Johnson contributed with the bat in the second innings as well and scored an unbeaten 45-ball 39. England's run chase started towards the end of the third day in disastrous manner, losing two wickets before stumps. Johnson continued to trouble Trott with short-pitched bowling; ESPNcricinfo described, "Against Johnson, [Trott] looks unbalanced both physically and mentally." Batting on 7, Trott had mishit a hook off bouncer from Johnson but the ball landed safely. However, he was dismissed on 9 when Johnson had him flicking one straight into the hands of Nathan Lyon.

On the fourth day, Johnson broke the third-wicket partnership between Cook and Kevin Pietersen by dismissing the latter with a top-edge to the long leg fielder. Peter Siddle and Lyon then reduced England to 6/146 and exposed England's lower-order to Johnson. Johnson took three of the remaining four wickets. England were bowled out for 179 before stumps on the fourth day, giving Australia a 381-run victory. Johnson finished with figures of 5 for 42 and won the man of the match for his all-round efforts. Towards the end of England's second innings, the Australians had set an attacking field for Johnson, about which ESPNcricinfo wrote in their report, "Every fielder was there for the kill: four slips, a fly slip, two leg slips, silly mid off, short leg."

Second Test
The second test was held in Adelaide and saw Australia win the toss and elect to bat. The Australians started well with 1/155, however finished the first day at 5/273. The second day ensued with excellent partnerships and Australia declaring on 9/570. England started their innings met with pace and ferocity from Johnson. After beating the batsman on numerous occasion, he was able to claim the first wicket, Alastair Cook (3 runs) after 2.4 overs of play. Johnson made an appeal for LBW on the last ball of the day, however was not reviewed by the Australians. It was later shown on DRS to be out. The visitors ending the day with 1/35.

The third morning saw Australia gain another 2 quick wickets, Root and Pietersen, both caught on 15 and 4 respectively. The scorecard 3/66. Carberry and Bell started to consolidate, with a partnership of 45 runs. However, when Carberry was caught out on 60, this sparked the start of dramatic collapse, that would ultimately see Johnson take the remaining 6 wickets of the innings and win him player of the match. He took the advantage via belittling the new incoming batsman claiming 3 wickets in one over just after lunch. It was the first ball of the 50th over where Johnson dismissed Stokes on 1 for LBW. Four balls later Matt Prior is caught behind on 0. The very next ball Broad is dismissed, bowled leg stump for a duck. After the 50th over England was reduced to 7/117. The remaining batsmen struggled. Swann was dismissed by Johnson, caught at 2nd slip by Clarke. Anderson was then bowled middle stump the ball after for a duck. Johnson at this moment on a hat trick, bowled to Bell who mistimed his shot, hitting the ball up to bounce just short of the man at cover. The final wicket was 15 overs later where Johnson bowled Panesar on off stump. England was all out for 172, a 398 run deficit. Johnson was able to claim one of his best ever bowling figures of 7/40.

The remainder of the day saw Australia bat their second innings and were 3/132 at stumps.

Australia declared overnight with the threat of rain on day 4 and 5.

England's second innings started with Johnson taking 1 more wicket, having Cook caught on 1 run. England had progressed to 6/247 at the end of the 4th day. On the 5th day Australia quickly wrapped up the innings with England all out for 312 (Australia had won by 218 runs). For Mitchell Johnson's outstanding performance he was named man of the match.

At this point in the series (out of the two test matches), Johnson had a total of 17 wickets at an average of 12.

Third Test
The third test in Perth, Australia won the toss and elected to bat. Australia had an unchanged line-up, while England replaced Panesar with Bresnan. The first day saw Johnson join Smith in the middle after Haddin was dismissed, ending a 124 run partnership with Smith, the score 6/267. Australia reached the end of the day without further loss at 6/326, with Smith on 103 and Johnson on 39. England removed Johnson early on the second morning without adding to his overnight score, and shortly afterwards Smith was dismissed for 111. The tourists quickly wrapped up the innings with Australia all out for 385.

In response England openers added 85 runs before the first dismissal, Carberry on 43. England progressed to 3/136. The next wicket saw Pietersen fall to an athletic catch by Johnson at mid-on. England were 4/146. At the close, England were 4/180. Australia efficiently wrapped up the innings on the third morning, dismissing England for 251, a 134-run lead. Johnson gained another wicket when Stokes was caught behind on 18. In the 81st over, Johnson bowled Broad (lbw), with England 8/229. In this innings Johnson bowled 22 overs, 7 of which were maidens and had taken 2 wickets for 62 runs (economy of 2.81 runs per over).

Johnson did not bat in Australia's second innings as Australia declared on 6/369, with England needing 504 runs to win. Johnson's first wicket of England's second innings was Root, caught behind on 19. England were 3/76. The middle-order batsmen were dismissed largely by Lyon and Siddle. However Johnson was able to take the wicket of Prior, who was also caught behind on 26, and England 6/296. The next wicket taken by Johnson was Bresnan, who was caught by Rogers on 12, England at this point 9/349. The last wicket of the day came when Anderson was caught by Bailey (and bowled by Johnson) on 2 runs. Australia won by 150 runs, securing a 3–0 series lead, and with it, their first Ashes series win since 2006–07.

References

External links
 2013-14 Ashes series on ESPNcricinfo

The Ashes